Tesfagiorgis is a surname. Notable people with the surname include:

 Paulos Tesfagiorgis, Eritrean activist
 Freida High Wasikhongo Tesfagiorgis (born 1946), American artist and academic

Surnames of African origin